Dil Hi To Hai (It is only a heart) is a 1963 Indian Bollywood film directed by C.L. Rawal, P.L. Santoshi and produced by B.L. Rawal. It stars Raj Kapoor and Nutan in pivotal roles.

Cast
 Raj Kapoor ... Yusuf / Chand / Khan
 Nutan ... Jameela Banu
 Pran ... Shaikhu / Yusuf
 Agha ... Bashir
 Nazir Hussain ... Khan Bahadur 
 Padmini Priyadarshini ... Bahar (Courtesan)
 Sabita Chatterjee ... Razia (Bashir's Wife)
 Saroj Khan ... Group Dancer (Age 13) "Nigahe Milane Ko Ji Chahta Hai"
Manorama as Shaikhu's Mother
Shivraj as Shaikhu's Father
Leela Chitnis as Maid-servant
Hari Shivdasani as Chand's Father
Mumtaz Begum as Chand's Mother

Music
Songs of the film and its music were highly popular. The songs were penned by lyricist Sahir Ludhiyanvi, and their music was composed by Roshan.
It has a popular song "Laaga Chunri Mein Daag", sung by Manna Dey.

References

External links

1960s Hindi-language films
1963 films
Films scored by Roshan